"Sober" is a song co-written by Andy Goldmark and Wayne Kirkpatrick and performed by American singer Jennifer Paige. It was released in February 1999 as the second single from her debut studio album, Jennifer Paige. It failed to chart in the United States but entered top 75 in the United Kingdom, Australia, and New Zealand.

Music video
The music video was first shown in April 1999 and was directed by American director Chris Applebaum.

Track listings
Australian CD single
 "Sober" (radio edit)
 "Crush" (original version)
 "Crush" (David Morales remix)
 "Sober" (instrumental)
 "Get to Me" (album version)

UK CD single
 "Sober" (radio edit) – 4:00
 "Sober" (instrumental) – 4:02
 "Get to Me" (album version) – 4:00

UK cassette single and European CD single
 "Sober" (radio edit) – 4:00
 "Sober" (instrumental) – 4:00

Credits and personnel
Credits are lifted from the Australian CD single liner notes.

Studios
 Recorded at The Beanstalk (Franklin, Tennessee) and Final Approach (Encino, Los Angeles)
 Mixed at Barking Doctor Studio (Mount Kisco, New York)
 Mastered at More Than One

Personnel
 Andy Goldmark – music, words, production, arrangement, recording (Final Approach)
 Wayne Kirkpatrick – music, words, production, arrangement
 Tom Laune – recording (Beanstalk)
 Mick Guzauski – mixing
 Tom Bender – mixing assistance
 Rhys Moody – mastering

Charts

Release history

References

1998 songs
1999 singles
Edel AG singles
Jennifer Paige songs
Music videos directed by Chris Applebaum
Songs written by Andy Goldmark
Songs written by Wayne Kirkpatrick